Roy C. Afflerbach (born February 6, 1945 in Allentown, Pennsylvania) is an American lobbyist and former Pennsylvania State Senator and Representative.  He was mayor of Allentown, Pennsylvania, the third largest city in Pennsylvania, from 2002 to 2006. In December 2004, after a difficult year, Afflerbach announced that he would not run for another term.

Military and education
He is a graduate of Emmaus High School in Emmaus, Pennsylvania, and served in the United States Air Force from 1963 through 1967. Afflerbach later earned his BA from Kutztown University of Pennsylvania in 1972, and an MA in 1989.

Political career

State legislative career
Afflerbach is a Democrat and began his career in politics as a State Representative for the 131st district, a position he held from 1983 through 1986. He later served as a State Senator for the 16th district from 1987 through 1998.

Mayoral career
Afflerbach served as mayor of Allentown, Pennsylvania from 2002 through 2006. His Deputy mayor was Democratic candidate in the 1997 mayoral election, Martin Velazquez III. His final year in office was mired in difficulty dealing with Allentown's city council. Some former supporters asked for his resignation, and he was blamed for nearly bungling a deal to bring a minor league baseball park to Allentown. He also was accused of making poorly timed inflammatory remarks.

Post-electoral career
After leaving office, Afflerbach started the Afflerbach Group, an Allentown-based lobbying firm. Among its causes are lobbying for an end to animal cruelty in Pennsylvania through factory farming practices known as "common farming exemptions." Afflerbach spoke in late 2007 at a fundraiser sponsored by Hugs for Puppies, a group pushing for the ban of the sale of foie gras in Philadelphia.

References

External links 
 Biography at Afflerbach Group 
  at Pennsylvania State Assembly

1945 births
Living people
20th-century American politicians
21st-century American politicians
Emmaus High School alumni
Kutztown University of Pennsylvania alumni
Pennsylvania lobbyists
United States Air Force airmen
Democratic Party members of the Pennsylvania House of Representatives
Democratic Party Pennsylvania state senators
Mayors of Allentown, Pennsylvania